Tak-e Sofla (also Romanized as Tāḵ-e Soflá) is a village in Darreh Kayad Rural District, Sardasht District, Dezful County, Khuzestan Province, Iran. At the 2006 census, its population was 30, in 6 families.

References 

Populated places in Dezful County